Alanïa is a former Norwegian electronic music group from Tromsø, composed of Torbjørn Brundtland and Svein Berge of Röyksopp, Rune Lindbæk and Gaute Barlindhaug.

History
Lindbæk and Brundtland were officially the main members of the group, but Berge and Barlindhaug were notable contributors. Almost all music was made by Brundtland, Berge and Barlindhaug. They have released the albums Instinctive Travels (1996) on Parlophone and Skyjuice (1997) on Drum Island Records. The group dissolved in 1997, and Berge and Brundtland started Röyksopp in 1998.

Critics have said that the music has a "unique, polar mood"  and that the skill level of the productions "makes it very nice to be Norwegian, and make you wish that Tromsø was your hometown".

Discography
 Instinctive Travels (1996)
 Skyjuice (1997)

See also
 Röyksopp
 Svein Berge
 Torbjørn Brundtland
 Drum Island
 Aedena Cycle
 Gaute Barlindhaug

External links 
 Alanïa at Last.fm
 Alanïa discography at Discogs
 royksoppsvarer.com from Archived.org

References 

Norwegian ambient music groups
Electronic music duos
Musical groups established in 1996
1996 establishments in Norway
Musical groups disestablished in 1997
Musical groups from Tromsø